Natig, Natik or Natiq, is a given name and surname that means Speaking. It may refer to:
Given name
Natig Aliyev, Azerbaijani politician
Natig Eyvazov (born 1970), Azerbaijani wrestler
Natik Bagirov (born 1964), Azerbaijani-Belarusian judoka 
Natik Hashim (1960–2004), Iraqi football defender
Natig Rasulzadeh (born 1949), Azerbaijani writer
Natig Shirinov (born 1975), Azerbaijani percussionist

Surname
Saad Natiq (born 1994), Iraqi football player